The Tully River is a river located in Far North Queensland, Australia.

Course and features
The Tully River rises in the Cardwell Range, part of the Great Dividing Range on the northern boundary of the Kirrama State Forest. The river flows generally north through Lake Koombooloomba and flows over the Tully Falls near  and descends through the Tully Gorge within the Tully Gorge National Park, part of the UNESCO World Heritagelisted Wet Tropics site. Below the dam wall, the river is joined by five minor tributaries before emptying into the Coral Sea at Tully Heads. The river descends  over its  course.

People and land use
The Tully, together with the Herbert and the Burdekin rivers, were part of the proposed Bradfield Scheme to divert the upper reaches of the three rivers west of the Great Dividing Range and into the Thomson River designed to irrigate and drought-proof much of the western Queensland interior, as well as large areas of South Australia. The Scheme was proposed in 1938 and abandoned in 1947.

At the Koombooloomba Dam, the Koombooloomba Hydro Power Station and a little further downriver, the Kareeya Hydro Power Station, generate hydroelectric power from the flow of the river.

In 2007 there was a white water rafting accident which took the life of 22-year-old Townsville woman at Tully Gorge. Another man drowned at Tully Gorge while rafting on 14 February 2009. A 2012 inquest into five deaths on the river due to rafting incidents that occurred between July 2007 and February 2009 recommended that each rapid be risk assessed and that a code of practice be adopted for the industry.

Etymology
The river was named in honour of William Alcock Tully, Surveyor General of Queensland  from 1875 to 1889.

See also

References

Rivers of Far North Queensland
Wet Tropics of Queensland
Bodies of water of the Coral Sea